Mera ur kärlekens språk (aka More from the Language of Love and More about the Language of Love, also released as Language of Love 2) is a 1970 Swedish sex educational film directed by Torgny Wickman. It is a sequel to the 1969 film Language of Love and had a sequel in 1971, Kärlekens XYZ. In 1973 the three films were edited together into a new film, Det bästa ur Kärlekens språk-filmerna ("The Best from the Language of Love Films"). The film dealt more with alternative sexuality and life styles and the disabled but was equally successful financially as Language of Love.

As with its predecessor, the film was initially refused a UK cinema certificate in 1972 by the BBFC. It was eventually passed with 3 minutes of cuts for theatrical release under the title Language of Love 2 in February 1983 and again for video in 1987. It was finally passed uncut in 2009 as part of a 3 DVD set entitled Swedish Erotica.

A Swedish sex education film with the same title, directed by Anders Lennberg, was made in 2009.

Cast
 Maj-Briht Bergström-Walan
 Inge Hegeler
 Sten Hegeler
 Bertil Hansson
 Johan Wallin
 Bengt Lindqvist
 Bengt Berggren
 Bruno Kaplan
 Tommy Hedlund
 Anna Berggren
 Mirjam Israel
 Ove Alström
 Göran Bergstrand
 Curt H:son Nilsson
 Lars Lennartsson
 Suzanne Hovinder
 Mogens Jacobsen
 Rune Pär Olofsson
 Annakarin Svedberg
 Wenche Willumsen
 Lars Ljungberg
 Helena Rohde
 Bent Rohweder
 Lasse Lundberg

References

External links
  (1970 film)
  (2009 film)
 
 

1970 films
Swedish erotic films
1970s Swedish-language films
Swedish LGBT-related films
Sexploitation films
Documentary films about sexuality
Swedish documentary films
Danish documentary films
1970 documentary films
1970 LGBT-related films
1970s Swedish films